The 2020 Ferrari Challenge North America was the 26th season of Ferrari Challenge competition in North America. The season consisted of 7 rounds, starting at the Daytona International Speedway on 23 January 2020 and concluding at the Misano World Circuit on 6 March 2021.

Calendar

Entry list
All teams and drivers used the Ferrari 488 Challenge Evo fitted with Pirelli tyres.

Trofeo Pirelli

Coppa Shell

Results and standings

Race results

Championship standings
Points were awarded to the top ten classified finishers as follows:

Trofeo Pirelli

Coppa Shell

‡ Driver ineligible for championship points.

References

External links
 Official website

North America 2020
Ferrari Challenge North America
Ferrari Challenge North America